Thomas Muirhead Flett (28 July 1923 – 13 February 1976) was an English mathematician at Sheffield University working on analysis.

Biography 
Thomas Muirhead Flett was born on 28 July 1923, in London, England, when his parents moved from Scotland to London. At age 11, he won a scholarship by the County of Middlesex  from a state primary school to University College School (U.C.S.), Hampstead.

Career 
Flett was first employed as a laboratory assistant in Post Office Research Station at Dollis Hill. While working, he studied part-time at Acton Technical College and obtained first class Honours in the London University B.Sc. general Degree in Mathematics and Physics. After working in the Post Office Research Station for three years, Flett worked as a research physicist at Simmonds Aerocessories in Brentford for two years. In 1945, pursuing his interest in Mathematics at Chelsea Polytecnic, he obtained class Honours in the B.Sc. Special Degree in Mathematics. In 1946, he obtained a mark in optional subjects, and in 1947, he was awarded for M.Sc. in Mathematics of London University.

References 

1923 births
1976 deaths
20th-century English mathematicians